Samogitian Sanctuary is a pagan sanctuary in Šventoji, Lithuania, a reconstruction of a medieval pagan observatory. The poles corresponding to the gods and goddesses of the Balts can be used to observe the main calendar holidays.

It is based on archeological records of the paleoastronomic observatory and pagan shrine that existed on Birutė Hill in Palanga until the 16th century. The wooden poles were carved by Lithuanian folk artists and were installed in June 1998. Neopagans use the sanctuary for devotional ceremonies during the major holidays.

See also 
Birutė
List of modern pagan temples
Romuva (religion)

References 

Modern paganism in Lithuania
Astronomical observatories in Lithuania
Archaeoastronomy
Baltic modern paganism
Modern pagan buildings
Religious buildings and structures completed in 1998
1990s in modern paganism